Kuweires may refer to:

 Kuweires, Idlib, a village in Idlib Governorate, Syria
 Kuweires Sharqi, a town in Aleppo Governorate, Syria
 Kuweires Military Airbase, Syrian airbase near Kuweires Sharqi
 Kuweires offensive (September–November 2015)